Zhigulyovsk constituency (No.161) is a Russian legislative constituency in Samara Oblast. Until 2007 the constituency, under the name "Syzran constituency", covered cities of Syzran and Zhigulyovsk and large portions of rural western Samara Oblast. In 2016 the constituency was heavily gerrymandered by being stretched to Tolyatti in the Tolyatti constituency and Chapayevsk in the Novokuybyshevsk constituency, and it was renamed "Zhigulyovsk constituency".

Members

Election results

1993

|-
! colspan=2 style="background-color:#E9E9E9;text-align:left;vertical-align:top;" |Candidate
! style="background-color:#E9E9E9;text-align:left;vertical-align:top;" |Party
! style="background-color:#E9E9E9;text-align:right;" |Votes
! style="background-color:#E9E9E9;text-align:right;" |%
|-
|style="background-color:"|
|align=left|Yevgeny Gusarov
|align=left|Independent
|
|22.06%
|-
| colspan="5" style="background-color:#E9E9E9;"|
|- style="font-weight:bold"
| colspan="3" style="text-align:left;" | Total
| 
| 100%
|-
| colspan="5" style="background-color:#E9E9E9;"|
|- style="font-weight:bold"
| colspan="4" |Source:
|
|}

1995

|-
! colspan=2 style="background-color:#E9E9E9;text-align:left;vertical-align:top;" |Candidate
! style="background-color:#E9E9E9;text-align:left;vertical-align:top;" |Party
! style="background-color:#E9E9E9;text-align:right;" |Votes
! style="background-color:#E9E9E9;text-align:right;" |%
|-
|style="background-color:"|
|align=left|Oleg Savitsky
|align=left|Agrarian Party
|
|37.44%
|-
|style="background-color:"|
|align=left|Valery Setezhev
|align=left|Independent
|
|14.82%
|-
|style="background-color:"|
|align=left|Igor Bersenev
|align=left|Our Home – Russia
|
|12.90%
|-
|style="background-color:"|
|align=left|Yevgeny Gusarov (incumbent)
|align=left|Independent
|
|8.55%
|-
|style="background-color:"|
|align=left|Sergey Afanasyev
|align=left|Independent
|
|6.88%
|-
|style="background-color:"|
|align=left|Aleksey Bazarov
|align=left|Independent
|
|5.59%
|-
|style="background-color:#2C299A"|
|align=left|Nikolay Gavrilov
|align=left|Congress of Russian Communities
|
|5.40%
|-
|style="background-color:#000000"|
|colspan=2 |against all
|
|6.62%
|-
| colspan="5" style="background-color:#E9E9E9;"|
|- style="font-weight:bold"
| colspan="3" style="text-align:left;" | Total
| 
| 100%
|-
| colspan="5" style="background-color:#E9E9E9;"|
|- style="font-weight:bold"
| colspan="4" |Source:
|
|}

1999

|-
! colspan=2 style="background-color:#E9E9E9;text-align:left;vertical-align:top;" |Candidate
! style="background-color:#E9E9E9;text-align:left;vertical-align:top;" |Party
! style="background-color:#E9E9E9;text-align:right;" |Votes
! style="background-color:#E9E9E9;text-align:right;" |%
|-
|style="background-color:"|
|align=left|Vladimir Mokry
|align=left|Independent
|
|57.98%
|-
|style="background-color:"|
|align=left|Oleg Savitsky (incumbent)
|align=left|Independent
|
|27.97%
|-
|style="background-color:"|
|align=left|Aleksandr Klishin
|align=left|Liberal Democratic Party
|
|3.20%
|-
|style="background-color:"|
|align=left|Sergey Fedisov
|align=left|Independent
|
|2.88%
|-
|style="background-color:#000000"|
|colspan=2 |against all
|
|6.15%
|-
| colspan="5" style="background-color:#E9E9E9;"|
|- style="font-weight:bold"
| colspan="3" style="text-align:left;" | Total
| 
| 100%
|-
| colspan="5" style="background-color:#E9E9E9;"|
|- style="font-weight:bold"
| colspan="4" |Source:
|
|}

2003

|-
! colspan=2 style="background-color:#E9E9E9;text-align:left;vertical-align:top;" |Candidate
! style="background-color:#E9E9E9;text-align:left;vertical-align:top;" |Party
! style="background-color:#E9E9E9;text-align:right;" |Votes
! style="background-color:#E9E9E9;text-align:right;" |%
|-
|style="background-color:"|
|align=left|Vladimir Mokry (incumbent)
|align=left|United Russia
|
|52.63%
|-
|style="background-color:"|
|align=left|Svetlana Kuzmina
|align=left|Communist Party
|
|30.44%
|-
|style="background-color:"|
|align=left|Nikolay Yevtushenko
|align=left|Liberal Democratic Party
|
|4.25%
|-
|style="background-color:#1042A5"|
|align=left|Oleg Bartenev
|align=left|Union of Right Forces
|
|1.54%
|-
|style="background-color:#164C8C"|
|align=left|Yevgeny Mineev
|align=left|United Russian Party Rus'
|
|1.16%
|-
|style="background-color:#000000"|
|colspan=2 |against all
|
|8.56%
|-
| colspan="5" style="background-color:#E9E9E9;"|
|- style="font-weight:bold"
| colspan="3" style="text-align:left;" | Total
| 
| 100%
|-
| colspan="5" style="background-color:#E9E9E9;"|
|- style="font-weight:bold"
| colspan="4" |Source:
|
|}

2016

|-
! colspan=2 style="background-color:#E9E9E9;text-align:left;vertical-align:top;" |Candidate
! style="background-color:#E9E9E9;text-align:left;vertical-align:top;" |Party
! style="background-color:#E9E9E9;text-align:right;" |Votes
! style="background-color:#E9E9E9;text-align:right;" |%
|-
|style="background-color:"|
|align=left|Yevgeny Serper
|align=left|United Russia
|
|47.89%
|-
|style="background-color:"|
|align=left|Aleksey Krasnov
|align=left|Communist Party
|
|11.26%
|-
|style="background-color:"|
|align=left|Mikhail Usov
|align=left|Liberal Democratic Party
|
|10.83%
|-
|style="background:"| 
|align=left|Andrey Yevdokimov
|align=left|Party of Growth
|
|6.82%
|-
|style="background:"| 
|align=left|Nikolay Shishlov
|align=left|A Just Russia
|
|5.67%
|-
|style="background:"| 
|align=left|Mikhail Kapishin
|align=left|Communists of Russia
|
|5.33%
|-
|style="background-color:" |
|align=left|Yulia Ivanova
|align=left|The Greens
|
|2.75%
|-
|style="background:"| 
|align=left|Igor Yermolenko
|align=left|Yabloko
|
|1.78%
|-
|style="background:"| 
|align=left|Oleg Svintsov
|align=left|Patriots of Russia
|
|1.49%
|-
|style="background:"| 
|align=left|Artem Tonkikh
|align=left|People's Freedom Party
|
|1.31%
|-
| colspan="5" style="background-color:#E9E9E9;"|
|- style="font-weight:bold"
| colspan="3" style="text-align:left;" | Total
| 
| 100%
|-
| colspan="5" style="background-color:#E9E9E9;"|
|- style="font-weight:bold"
| colspan="4" |Source:
|
|}

2021

|-
! colspan=2 style="background-color:#E9E9E9;text-align:left;vertical-align:top;" |Candidate
! style="background-color:#E9E9E9;text-align:left;vertical-align:top;" |Party
! style="background-color:#E9E9E9;text-align:right;" |Votes
! style="background-color:#E9E9E9;text-align:right;" |%
|-
|style="background-color: " |
|align=left|Andrey Trifonov
|align=left|United Russia
|102,304
|45.13%
|-
|style="background-color: " |
|align=left|Vasily Vorobyev
|align=left|Communist Party
|48,304
|21.31%
|-
|style="background-color: " |
|align=left|Mikhail Maryakhin
|align=left|A Just Russia — For Truth
|16,400
|7.24%
|-
|style="background-color:"|
|align=left|Tatyana Bodrova
|align=left|Party of Pensioners
|15,889
|7.01%
|-
|style="background-color: " |
|align=left|Dmitry Kopylov
|align=left|Liberal Democratic Party
|14,867
|6.56%
|-
|style="background-color: " |
|align=left|Anton Skorokhodov
|align=left|New People
|10,461
|4.62%
|-
|style="background-color: " |
|align=left|Lyudmila Shaposhnikova
|align=left|Russian Party of Freedom and Justice
|4,425
|1.95%
|-
|style="background-color:" |
|align=left|Denis Stukalov
|align=left|The Greens
|4,268
|1.88%
|-
| colspan="5" style="background-color:#E9E9E9;"|
|- style="font-weight:bold"
| colspan="3" style="text-align:left;" | Total
| 226,669
| 100%
|-
| colspan="5" style="background-color:#E9E9E9;"|
|- style="font-weight:bold"
| colspan="4" |Source:
|
|}

Notes

References 

Politics of Samara Oblast
Russian legislative constituencies